Kelatapwa Farauta is a professor and the vice chancellor of Adamawa State University, Mubi. She was a former Adamawa state commissioner of education and Executive chairman of Universal Basic Education. She is currently the running mate of the incumbent governor of Adamawa State, Ahmadu Fintiri for the 2023 election.

Biography 
Kelatapwa Farauta was born on November 28, 1965 in Numan Local Government of Adamawa State. She obtained her primary school leaving certificate from Numan II Primary School, Numan in 1979. In 1983, she obtained her Senior School Certificate from Federal Government Girls College (FGGC) Yola. In 1987, she obtained her National Certificate in Education from Federal College of Education (FCE) Yola.  She bagged her first and second degree in Agricultural Extension at the University of Nigeria Nsukka in 1989 and 1995 respectively. She obtained her PhD from Federal University of Technology currently known as Modibbo Adama Federal University of Technology, Yola

Political Appointments 

From July  to October, 2014, Farauta served as the Executive Chairman, Adamawa State Universal Basic Education Board (ADSUBEB). On 28 August, 2015  Farauta assumed office as the Honourable Commissioner, Adamawa State Ministry of Higher Education and left office on 17th July, 2017.

Vice-Chancellorship 
On the 17 July, 2017, she was made the acting vice chancellor of Adamawa State University by the then governor of the state, Senator Muhammad Umaru Jibrilla Bindow. She was eventually confirmed as the vice chancellor by Ahmadu Fintiri.

References 

Nigerian academics
Nigerian political candidates
Nigerian women educators

Living people
People from Adamawa State
1965 births
University of Nigeria alumni